is a mutated, enormous spider-like kaiju that first appears in Toho's 1967 film Son of Godzilla and went on to appear in the films Destroy All Monsters, All Monsters Attack (through stock footage) and Godzilla: Final Wars. In the English language version of Son of Godzilla, Kumonga is referred to as Spiga, while subsequent films refer to it by its original name.

In 2020, a species of spitting spider, Scytodes kumonga, was named after this kaiju. Kumonga's scientific name in Godzilla Singular Point, Kumonga scytodes, pays homage to this species.

Overview

Showa
First appearing in the live-action film Son of Godzilla, Kumonga is depicted as a giant mutant spider who was initially found on Solgell Island. It captures Minilla and a Kamacuras in its web, killing the latter with its stinger. However, Godzilla arrives and defeats the monstrous spider with Minilla's help, who incinerate Kumonga with their atomic breath.

As of the live-action film Destroy All Monsters, a second Kumonga was relocated to Monsterland, where it lives Earth's other remaining monsters. They are captured and brainwashed by the alien Kilaaks, who send them to attack Earth's major cities. After a group of human astronauts destroy the Kilaaks' control device, the Earth monsters converge on the aliens' Earth outpost. They summon King Ghidorah to defend them, but Earth's monsters join forces to kill the space dragon before returning to Monsterland to live in peace.

The Showa Kumonga was 45 meters (150 feet) tall and weighed 8,000 metric tons (8,818 short tons).

Millennium
Kumonga appears in the 2004 live-action film Godzilla: Final Wars as one of many mind-controlled monsters used by the alien Xiliens. After a group of humans free Godzilla from Antarctica to stop them, the Xiliens dispatch Kumonga to New Guinea to battle Godzilla. The arachnid initially outmaneuvers and entangles its opponent in its thick webbing, but Godzilla uses the webbing to throw Kumonga across the horizon.

The Final Wars Kumonga was 60 meters (196 feet) tall, and weighed 30,000 metric tons (33,069b short tons).

Reiwa
Kumonga appears in the 2021 anime series Godzilla Singular Point as a social species of arachnid kaiju that take over a shipyard warehouse and attack the workers, resulting in Jet Jaguar and the Otaki Factory team coming to their rescue.

This version of Kumonga is a composite character, taking many design elements from Kamacuras, Megalon, Gigan, and Hedorah.

Powers and abilities
The Showa Kumonga can spit silk and deploy a venomous stinger from its mouth while the Millennium incarnation can jump and spit silk that can transform into canvas nets. The Singular Point Kumonga are capable of surviving being dismembered through their blue shapeshifting innards and are accompanied by multiple congeners, such as the scythe-armed Kamanga and their respective flying variants Hanenga and Zenbunga.

Appearances

Films
 Son of Godzilla (1967) 
 Destroy All Monsters (1968)
 All Monsters Attack (1969 - stock footage cameo)
 Godzilla vs. Gigan (1972 - stock footage cameo)
 Godzilla: Final Wars (2004)

Video games
 Godzilla vs. 3 Major Monsters (MSX - 1984)
 Godzilla / Godzilla-Kun: Kaijuu Daikessen (Game Boy - 1990)
 Kaijū-ō Godzilla / King of the Monsters, Godzilla (Game Boy - 1993)
 Godzilla Trading Battle (PlayStation - 1998)
 Godzilla Defense Force (2019)

Literature
 Son of Godzilla (comic - 1967)
 Godzilla: Kingdom of Monsters (comic - 2011-2012)
 Godzilla: Gangsters and Goliaths (comic - 2011)
 Godzilla: Legends (comic - 2011-2012)
 Godzilla: Ongoing (comic - 2012)
 Godzilla: The Half-Century War (comic - 2012-2013)
 Godzilla: Rulers of Earth (comic - 2013-2015)
 Godzilla: Monster Apocalypse (novel - 2017)
 Godzilla: Project Mechagodzilla (novel - 2018)
Godzilla: Monsters and Protectors (comic- 2021)

References

Fictional spiders
Godzilla characters
Toho monsters
Science fiction film characters
Fantasy film characters
Film characters introduced in 1967
Fictional characters with superhuman strength
Fictional mutants
Kaiju
Fictional monsters
Horror film villains